Edmund Wilbur Hudson "Ed" Buller (born 9 August 1962) is an English record producer and former musician. He has primarily worked with English bands including Suede, Pulp, The Raincoats and The Courteeners.

Biography
Buller was born in Reigate, Surrey. He first became interested in music after his father, composer John Buller, took him to see Stravinsky's ballet, The Rite of Spring, at the age of 6. As a teenager, he joined The Psychedelic Furs as a keyboard player and toured with them for several years. After leaving the band, he took up record production, moving his way up through London studios and eventually became the in-house engineer for Island Records. Buller's first successful album that he produced was Suede's debut album in 1993 which peaked #1 on the UK Albums Chart as well winning the Mercury Prize. During career he achieved two other number one albums (Suede's Coming Up and White Lies's To Lose My Life...) and a Brit awards nomination for best producer. In 1995, he worked with Flood, Gary Stout and Dave Bessell on Node; an analog-synth heavy project that produced a single album, Node (a follow-up was released in 2014: Node 2).

In 1998, Buller moved to California (where he lives) and studied composition and orchestration at the San Francisco Conservatory of Music. He has recently worked with British bands White Lies, The Courteeners, The Cheek and One Night Only, recording in Brussels, as well as Suede's comeback album Bloodsports in March 2013, and their seventh album Night Thoughts in January 2016.

Selected production credits
 2022: Suede - Autofiction (Producer)
 2019: White Lies - Five (Producer & Engineer)
 2016: Suede - Night Thoughts (Producer)
 2013: White Lies - Big TV (Producer & Engineer)
 2013: Suede - Bloodsports (Producer & Engineer)
 2010: The Courteeners - Falcon (Producer)
 2010: One Night Only - One Night Only (Producer & Engineer)
 2009: White Lies - To Lose My Life... (Producer & Engineer)
 2009: Blacklist - Midnight of the Century (Mixer & Keyboards)
 2007: Martino Conspiracy - Hope in Isolation (Engineer)
 2005: Alex Lloyd - Alex Lloyd (Producer, Engineer & Mixer)
 2005: t.A.T.u. - Dangerous and Moving (Producer)
 2003: Steve Burns - Songs for Dustmites (Producer & Engineer)
 2001: Eskimo Joe - Girl (Producer & Engineer)
 2001: Outerstar - Outerstar (Mixer & Engineer)
 2001: Stabbing Westward - Stabbing Westward (Producer & Engineer)
 2000: The Superjesus - Jet Age (Producer & Engineer) 
 2000: Tinfed - Tried + True (Producer & Engineer)
 1999: Alex Lloyd - Black The Sun (Producer & Engineer)
 1999: Ben Lee - Breathing Tornados (Producer & Engineer)
 1999: Justin Clayton - Limb (Mixer)
 1997: Closer - Don't Walk(Producer & Engineer)
 1997: Gravity Kills - Manipulated (Mixer)
 1996: Suede - Coming Up (Producer & Engineer)
 1996: Raincoats - Looking in the Shadows (Producer & Engineer)
 1994: Suede - Dog Man Star (Producer & Engineer)
 1994: Pulp - His 'n' Hers (Producer & Mixer)
 1993: Slowdive - Souvlaki (Mixer)
 1993: Suede - Suede (Producer & Engineer)
 1992: The Boo Radleys - Everything's Alright Forever (Producer & Engineer)
 1991: The Primitives - Galore (Producer)
 1990: Lush (band) - Sweetness and Light (EP) (Engineer)
 1988: Jim Capaldi - Some Come Running (Engineer & Mixer)

Sources

In the 1990s he was also contracted to work with a band called That Uncertain Feeling. This was a band signed to the Dead Dead Good record label, whose other roster was The Charlatans as managed by Steve Harrison. The Edge when to number 2 position in the Billboard College Charts and was featured on BBC Radio 1.

References

Notes
 Peaked as number 1 on the UK Albums Chart.
 Won a Mercury Prize award.
 Nominated for a Brit Award for best producer.

External links
Ed Buller video interview
Sound on Sound: Zero Crossing Interview with Ed Buller and Gary Stout on Node project.

1962 births
Living people
English record producers
San Francisco Conservatory of Music alumni
People from Reigate
Musicians from Surrey